Marc-André Thinel (born March 24, 1981) is a Canadian former professional ice hockey winger who last played for Dragons de Rouen in the Ligue Magnus, and served as the team's captain. He was drafted 145th overall by the Montreal Canadiens in the 1999 NHL Entry Draft.

His twin brother Sébastien was also a professional hockey player; they were teammates for three years as juniors at Victoriaville Tigres, and during the 2006–07 season at Rouen.

References

External links

1981 births
Living people
Canadian ice hockey left wingers
Columbus Cottonmouths (ECHL) players
Hamilton Bulldogs (AHL) players
Ice hockey people from Quebec
Lexington Men O' War players
Montreal Canadiens draft picks
People from Saint-Jérôme
Quebec Citadelles players
Rouen HE 76 players
Utah Grizzlies (AHL) players
Victoriaville Tigres players
Canadian expatriate ice hockey players in France
Canadian expatriate ice hockey players in the United States
Canadian twins
Naturalized citizens of France
Dragons de Rouen players
Twin sportspeople